Pagemill Partners is a technology investment bank located in Palo Alto, California in the heart of Silicon Valley, providing financial advisory services, including merger and acquisition (M&A), private placement and specialized financial studies, to emerging and middle-market technology companies.

History 
Pagemill Partners was founded in 2003. Pagemill Partners has a footprint with approximately a third of all transactions closing. The firm publishes a quarterly review on technology merger and acquisition trends and has completed over 15 transactions since 2005.

Pagemill Partners serves the transaction needs of the broader technology market with experience in: software, hardware, communications, and internet media.

During 2010, Pagemill Partners was recognized a Financial Advisory Firm Cross-Border M&A Advisor by ACQ. In 2009, the firm received the Business from ACQ for exemplary success as a global award.

Management Team 

 Scott Munro: Vice Chairman
 Karan Kapoor: Technology Mergers & Acquisitions - Los Angeles
 Rory O'Sullivan: Technology Mergers & Acquisitions - Europe
 Nicholas Collins: Technology Mergers & Acquisitions - Palo Alto
 Jacques Giard: Mergers & Acquisitions - France
 Andreas Stoecklin: Mergers & Acquisitions - Germany
 David Lu: Mergers & Acquisitions - China
 Luke Mooney: Mergers & Acquisitions - Ireland
 Howard Johnson: Mergers & Acquisitions - Canada
 Nicholas Depardieu: Managing Director
 Robert A. Bartell: Managing Director & Global Head of Corporate Finance
 Marc Chiang: Financial Due Diligence - San Francisco
 Brooks Dexter: Healthcare Technology Mergers & Acquisitions - Los Angeles
 Ham Crawford: Private Equity Financial Sponsors Team - New York
 Kevin Iudicello: Senior Advisor - Palo Alto
 Glen Kernick: Valuation Advisory - Palo Alto
 Greg Franceschi: Valuation Advisory - Palo Alto
 Jason Smolanoff: Global Practice Leader, Kroll Cyber Risk - Los Angeles

References 

 Quarterly Technology M&A Reviews, August 14, 2011
 Transactions, September 14, 2011
 ACQ Business of the Year 2009, January 15, 2010
 AlwaysOn Top Dealmaker Award, December 3, 2008

External links 
 Pagemill Partners

Investment banks in the United States
American companies established in 2003
Financial services companies established in 2003
Banks established in 2003
Companies based in Palo Alto, California